Hans Goltz (11 August 1873 in Elbing (Elbląg), Prussia, Germany - 21 October 1927 in Baden-Baden) was a German art dealer, known as a pioneer of modernism in art.

1873 births
1927 deaths
People from Elbląg
People from the Province of Prussia
German art dealers